FC Beshtau Lermontov was a Russian football team from Lermontov. It played professionally from 1992 to 1999. Their best result was 10th place in Zone 1 of the Russian Second Division in 1992.

External links
  Team history at KLISF

Association football clubs established in 1992
Association football clubs disestablished in 2000
Defunct football clubs in Russia
Sport in Stavropol Krai
1992 establishments in Russia
2000 disestablishments in Russia